Eteobalea sexnotella is a moth in the  family Cosmopterigidae. It is found in North America, where it has been recorded from New Hampshire to Florida, as well as in Arkansas, Texas and Ontario.

The wingspan is about 17 mm. Adults have been recorded on wing in January and from March to September.

The larvae feed on Trichostema dichotomum and Trichostema suffrutescens. Larval feeding causes stem galls.

References

Natural History Museum Lepidoptera generic names catalog

Eteobalea
Moths described in 1878